is the 34th studio album by Japanese singer-songwriter Miyuki Nakajima, released in November 2006.

The album comprises 12 tracks, and 4 of them were initially composed for other artists, such as "A Key" for 
Shizuka Kudo and "Only for the Sake of Love" for Hiromi Iwasaki. "Say Goodbye to That Goodbye", a song originally recorded by Tomomi Kahala, became the final release for her who has semi-retired since 2007. The most well-known is "Ship in the Air" interpreted by boy band Tokio. Their recording was featured as the closing theme for My Boss, My Hero, a television drama remake of Korean motion picture and starring Tomoya Nagase, a lead vocalist of the band. It was released as a single in August 2007 and debuted at the number-one on the Japanese Oricon weekly singles chart with more than 120,000 copies sold. A song remained on the country's hit parade for about a year, finally becoming one of the biggest hit singles for the group.

In December 2006, her successful contribution for Tokio was acclaimed by the Japan Composer's Association, winning the 48th Japan Record Award for "Best Lyrics".

Because "Ship in the Air" by Tokio became massive hit, Lullaby Singer also gained relatively moderate 
commercial success with the sales of 110,000 copies, despite it managed to enter the top-10 on the Oricon albums chart.

Track listing
All songs written and composed by Miyuki Nakajima, arranged by Ichizo Seo (except M1/10 co-arranged by Nakajima, M7/11 co-arranged by Satoshi Nakamura, and M8/12 co-arranged by Nakajima and Ittetsu Gen)
"" – 2:24
"" – 5:19
"" – 4:19
"" – 4:56
"" – 5:37
"" – 4:56
"" – 4:56
"" – 5:58
"" – 4:11
"" – 4:54
"" – 7:02
"" – 5:22

Personnel
Miyuki Nakajima – vocals, acoustic guitar
Ichizo Seo – keyboards, background vocals
Vinnie Colaiuta – drums
Gregg Bissonette – drums
Joey Waronker – drums
Denny Fongheiser – drums
Nozomi Furukawa – electric guitar, nylon strings guitar, bouzouki
Masayoshi Furukawa – electric guitar, acoustic guitar
Michael Thompson – electric guitar, acoustic guitar
Chuei Yoshikawa – acoustic guitar, 12 string guitar
Neil Stubenhaus – electric bass
Shingo Kobayashi – acoustic piano, keyboards, hammond organ, computer programming, background vocals
Jon Gilutin – acoustic piano, electric piano, keyboards, strings pad, hammond organ
Keishi Urata – computer programming
Chikanari Gokan – computer programming
Ittetsu Gen – violin
Takao Ochiai – violin
Daisuke Kadowaki – violin
Yoshiko Kaneko – violin
Yayoi Fujita – violin
Maki Nagata – violin
Takuya Mori – violin
Kaoru Kuroki – violin
Yuko Kajitani – violin
Jun Takeuchi – violin
Crusher Kimura – violin, viola
Shoko Miki – viola
Kaori Morita – cello
Tomoki Iwanaga – cello
Kazuki Chiba – contrabass
Yoshinobu Takeshita – contrabass
Satoshi Nakamura – saxophone
Taro Kiyooka – trombone
Isao Sakuma – trumpet
Fumikazu Miyashita – backing vocals
Kazuyo Sugimoto – backing vocals
Yuiko Tsubokura – backing vocals
Julia Waters – backing vocals
Maxine Waters – backing vocals
Oren Waters – backing vocals
Etsuro Wakakonai – backing vocals
Yasuhiro Kido – backing vocals
Hidekazu Utsumi – backing vocals
Katsumi Maeda – backing vocals
Kiyoshi Hiyama – backing vocals

Production
Producer, arranger: Ichizo Seo
Lyricist, composer, arranger, performer, co-arranger and co-producer: Miyuki Nakajima
Recording and mixing engineer: David Thoener
Additional recording engineer: Kengo Kato
Assistant mixing engineer: Wesley Seidman (at the Ocean Way Recording, Los Angeles)
Assistant mixing and recording engineer: Shuichiro Terao (at the Epicurus Studios, Tokyo)
Mastering Engineer: Tom Baker (at the Precision Mastering, Los Angeles)
Production director: Kentaro Fukushima
A&R director: Ryo Yoneya
Recording coordinators: Fumio Miyata, Tomoo Sato, Tomoko Takaya, Ruriko Duer
Interpreter:Masako Kawahara
Lyrics translator:Jonathan Katz, Hiroyuki Murakami
Costume coordinator: Shikiji Hazama
Photographer: Jin Tamura
Artwork designer: Hirofumi Arai
Hair, make-up artist: Noriko Izumisawa
Artist managers: Koji Suzuki, Koichi Okazaki
Assistant manager: Fumie Ohshima
General affairs: Aya Ninomiya
Disc promoters: Hisahiro Ando, Tatsuro Yamashita
General producer: Takumi Shimizu
DAD: Genichi Kawakami

Chart position

Release history

References

2006 albums
Miyuki Nakajima albums
Self-covers albums